Patricia Washburn Gunby is an American politician from the state of Missouri. A Democrat, she has represented the 99th district in the Missouri House of Representatives since January 2020.

Biography
Gunby earned a bachelor's degree in political science from the University of Tulsa. She won a special election to the Missouri House on November 5, 2019.

Gunby is a resident of Ballwin, Missouri. On August 2, 2021, Gunby announced her plans to run for the congressional seat currently held by Ann Wagner. She won the primary on August 2, 2022. Wagner defeated Gunby in the general election on November 8.

Electoral history

State representative

References

External links
 Representative Trish Gunby official legislative website
 Trish Gunby for Congress campaign website

21st-century American women
Living people
Democratic Party members of the Missouri House of Representatives
People from Ballwin, Missouri
University of Tulsa alumni
Women state legislators in Missouri
Year of birth missing (living people)